World's Finest Shows is the largest traveling carnival in Ontario, Canada. They are best known for providing a majority of the rides at the Central Canada Exhibition before its cancellation. They generally provide rides and equipment for fairs between 2 and 5 days long. Some events last over a week long. Their typical season runs from late-April to mid-October.

History
World's Finest Shows began in 1986 as a division of Conklin Shows, along with Supershows and the Bicycle Unit. In 1992, the division split off into its own company with Barry Jamieson becoming the president. The newly formed company bought out the assets and contracts of the Conklin eastern road show. The show remained based in Simcoe, Ontario with the barns at the fairgrounds used for storage and a workshop in the winter months. Needing a workshop for the company, they purchased a vacant workshop in Nanticoke, Ontario, which has been home to the show ever since. In 1997, World's Finest Shows won the contract for the Central Canada Exhibition in Ottawa (Commonly known as the Ottawa SuperEx).

When World's Finest Shows began, it had three units. It had the Trillium Unit, Talbot Unit, and the Supershow. The Supershow was a 10-ride rental service that lasted until mid-2002, when it was purchased by Dave and Jimmy Kong and turned into a full-time show. The Trillium Unit acts as the show's main unit, hosting the show's best equipment. The Talbot Unit is a smaller unit, that mostly consists of small, easy to set up rides for smaller events.

Throughout 2006 and 2007, World's Finest Shows sold many of their older rides to help pay off Canada's first Venetian Swing Carousel manufactured by Bertazzon, as well as to purchase three other rides: Fireball, Haunted Mansion, and Monkey Maze. The Venetian Swing Carousel, renamed "Wave Swinger," was first seen at the 2007 Central Canada Exhibition in Ottawa.

In August 2010, World's Finest Shows had qualified as a certified member of the OABA Circle of Excellence, the only midway provider in Canada to be awarded this designation.

After the cancellation of the Central Canada Exhibition in 2011, the company began to downsize to save money. In 2011, they sold their iconic Mack "Polar Express" for a smaller "Musik Express" model manufactured by Majestic Manufacturing. 2011 also saw the selling of their smaller ferris wheel, and Zamperla "Circus Train". They continued to downsize throughout the next few years, selling off their "Monkey Maze" funhouse, Chance "Zipper",  their Bertazzon "Wave Swinger" Swing Carousel, and their old Sellner "Tilt-A-Whirl".

Rides
Any ride that has been renamed since purchase has its former name(s) listed below its current name.

Current
Total: 45

References

Traveling carnivals